Dhok Masyal is a village in Jhelum District, Punjab Province, Pakistan. It is on the bank of the Nala Kahan near to the village of Malot.

References 

Populated places in Jhelum District